Alan Lee may refer to:
Alan Lee (bandleader) (1936–2022), Australian jazz bandleader, vibraphonist, guitarist and percussionist
Alan Lee (illustrator) (born 1947), English book illustrator and movie conceptual designer
Alan Lee (footballer) (born 1978), Irish footballer
Alan Lee (cricket writer) (1954–2015), British cricket writer
Alan David Lee (born 1955 or 1956), Australian actor

See also
Allan Lee (born 1963), film editor
Allen Lee (1940–2020), Hong Kong politician
 Allen S. Lee, scholar of Information Systems research